Ann Smyrner (3 November 1934 – 29 August 2016) was a Danish actress who was active in the 1960s in Italy, the United States, Austria and West Germany.  She played in adventure, comedy, science fiction, crime, and horror movies, among which are the Sidney Pink science fiction movies Reptilicus and Journey to the Seventh Planet (both 1962).

Ann Smyrner spent most of her screen career in Germany.  After she retired from acting in 1971, she moved to Spain because, as she stated in a 2001 interview, "Both the country (Denmark) and its people are too cold and boring."  Smyrner was the daughter of Danish stage actor Poul Smyrner.

Selected filmography

 Von allen geliebt (1957) – Cora Fürst
  (1958) – Lilli
 Here I Am, Here I Stay (1959) – Karin
 Triplets on Board (1959) – Rita
  (1960) – Susa Petersen
 Heaven, Love and Twine (1960) – Gerti
 Pension Schöller (1960) – Erika
 Il peccato degli anni verdi (1960) – Martina
 Island of the Amazons (1960) – Liz
 Reptilicus (1961) – Lise Martens
 The Last of Mrs. Cheyney (1961) – Boubou
 Das Mädchen und der Staatsanwalt (1962) – Monika Pinkus
 Journey to the Seventh Planet (1962) – Ingrid
 Drei Liebesbriefe aus Tirol (1962) – Linda Borg
 Romance in Venice (1962) – Andrea von Bruggern
 Ohne Krimi geht die Mimi nie ins Bett (1962) – Marion Keyser
 Das haben die Mädchen gern (1962) – Helga
 Breakfast in Bed (1963) – Claudia Westorp
 The Black Cobra (1963) – Alexa Bergmann
 Wochentags immer (1963) – Gwendolyn
 Storm Over Ceylon (1963) – Helga Ferlach
 Piccadilly Zero Hour 12 (1963) – Ruth Morgan
 Victim Five (1964) – Helga
 Holiday in St. Tropez (1964) – Heidi Kirschmann
 The Seventh Victim (1964) – Avril Mant
 Marry Me, Cherie (1964) – Marianne
 The Spy (1964, Egyptian film, directed by Niazi Mostafa)
 Diamond Walkers (1965) – Karen Truter
 L'uomo di Toledo (1965) – Doña Rosita
 El jassus (1965) – Eva / Rashel
 The Fountain of Love (1966) – Stina
 Angelique and the King''' (1966) – Thérèse
 Kommissar X – Drei gelbe Katzen (1966) – Babs Lincoln
 Mission Stardust (1967) – Dr. Sheridan
 The House of 1,000 Dolls (1967) – Marie Armstrong
 Heubodengeflüster (1967) – Dodo
  (1968) – Susanna Schwartz
 Beyond the Law (1968) – Lola / Betty
 The Killer Likes Candy (1968)
 Paradies der flotten Sünder (1968) – Laura
 Das Go-Go-Girl vom Blow Up (1969) – Wilma
 Why Did I Ever Say Yes Twice? (1969) – Püppi
 11 Uhr 20 (1970, TV Mini-Series) – Helga
 The Sex Nest (1970) – Baronin
 Aunt Trude from Buxtehude (1971) – Loni Martell
 Zu dumm zum... (1971) – Clarissa
 Ore di terrore (1971) – Maria Daniels
 Kreuzfahrt des Grauens'' (1971) – Mary

References

External links
 
  Ann Smyrner at Danskefilm.dk

1934 births
2016 deaths
Danish film actresses
People from Frederiksberg